Earl Henry "Butch" Buchholz, Jr. (born September 16, 1940) is a former professional tennis player from the United States who was one of the game's top players in the late 1950s and early 1960s.

Tennis career

Juniors
Buchholz was an outstanding junior, winning all three of the Boys' Singles slam titles in a row during 1958–1959:

French Open: (1958)
Wimbledon: (1958)
Australian Open: (1959)

Buchholz also won the U.S. National Boys’ 18 title in Kalamazoo, Michigan in 1958. 

On February 10, 1959, he appeared as a mystery contestant on the television quiz show To Tell the Truth, where he was described as holding the “grand slam” of junior tennis titles in France, England, Australia and the United States.

Amateur/Pro Tour
Buchholz was ranked by Lance Tingay the world No. 5 amateur player in 1960, and was ranked four times in the US Top 10. He played for the United States in the Davis Cup in 1959 and 1960. Buchholz reached the semifinals of the U.S. Championships in 1960, losing to Rod Laver in five sets.

Buchholz turned professional in 1961. He won the United States Pro Championship in 1962, by beating Pancho Segura in the finals. Buchholz was an original member of Lamar Hunt's Handsome Eight, a group of players signed by in 1968 for the newly formed professional World Championship Tennis (WCT) group.

Retirement
Since retiring as a player, Buchholz has served tennis in many professional and administrative capacities. He has been the Commissioner of World Team Tennis from 1977 to 1978, an Executive Director of the Association of Tennis Professionals from 1981 to 1982, and member of the men's pro council from 1981 to 1983.

In 1985, Buchholz founded the Lipton International Players Championships (now known as the Miami Open), which is now a leading event on both the men's and women's tours.

Buchholz helped create Altenis, a management company which oversees tennis tournaments in Latin America. He also helped secure the continuation of the Orange Bowl International Tennis Tournament, a prominent international junior event in Florida. In 1992, Buchholz teamed-up with Arthur Ashe to found the 'Good Life Mentoring Program', benefiting hundreds of elementary and middle school children in the greater Miami area.

In 2005, Buchholz was inducted into the International Tennis Hall of Fame in Newport, Rhode Island.

References

External links
 
 
 
 

American male tennis players
Australian Championships (tennis) junior champions
French Championships junior (tennis) champions
International Tennis Hall of Fame inductees
Tennis players from St. Louis
Wimbledon junior champions
1940 births
Living people
People from Westport, Connecticut
Professional tennis players before the Open Era
Grand Slam (tennis) champions in boys' singles
Grand Slam (tennis) champions in boys' doubles
20th-century American people